Siktyakh (Siikteex) is a rural locality (a selo), the only inhabited locality, and the administrative center of Siktyakhsky Rural Okrug of Bulunsky District in the Sakha Republic, Russia, located  from Tiksi, the administrative center of the district. Its population as of the 2010 Census was 287, up from 254 recorded during the 2002 Census.

Geography
Siktyakh is located on the left bank of the Lena, north of the Arctic Circle. Rivers Kuranakh-Siktyakh and Uel-Siktyakh have their mouths nearby on the facing bank.

References

Notes

Sources
Official website of the Sakha Republic. Registry of the Administrative-Territorial Divisions of the Sakha Republic. Bulunsky District. 

Rural localities in Bulunsky District
Populated places on the Lena River